Clyde Andrew Selleck Sr. (29 July 1888 – 9 January 1973) was a retired United States Army officer. During World War II, he commanded the 71st Division during the Philippines campaign and then spent more than three years as a prisoner of war after surrendering at Bataan in April 1942.

Early life and education
Selleck was born in Brandon, Vermont and raised in nearby Rutland. After studying at Norwich University for a year, he entered the United States Military Academy in June 1906. Selleck graduated in June 1910 and was commissioned as a second lieutenant of field artillery. He subsequently graduated from the School of Fire for Field Artillery in June 1913. Selleck later graduated from the Field Artillery School advanced course in June 1926, the Command and General Staff School in June 1927 and the Army War College in June 1935.

Military career
After commissioning, Selleck served with the 1st Field Artillery at Fort Sill in Oklahoma and Schofield Barracks in Hawaii. He then taught chemistry at the Military Academy from August 1913 to June 1916. Selleck was promoted to first lieutenant in July 1916 and captain in May 1917.

During World War I, Selleck received a temporary promotion to major in February 1918 before being sent to France with the 5th Division. He briefly served as a battalion commander with the 21st Field Artillery in August 1918. Selleck received a temporary promotion to lieutenant colonel in September 1918 and served as chief of staff of the VII Corps Artillery until November 1918. He then served as chief of staff and acting commander of the I Corps Artillery until January 1919.

After the war, Selleck taught at the School of Fire from July 1919 to December 1920. He reverted to captain in March 1920 before being permanently promoted to major in July 1920. Selleck served as a field artillery instructor with the New York National Guard from July 1921 to August 1925.

Selleck was assigned to the Militia Bureau in Washington, D.C. from June 1927 to June 1931. He then served as commanding officer of the 83rd Field Artillery at Fort Benning in Georgia from June 1931 to June 1934. Selleck was promoted to lieutenant colonel in October 1934 and colonel in April 1939.

Selleck was sent to the Philippines in October 1941 and assumed command of the 71st Division in November. After the Japanese invasion in December, he received a temporary promotion to brigadier general. After an additional month of combat, Selleck was relieved of command in January 1942. He was reduced in rank to colonel and reassigned as chief of staff, Service of Supply. After being captured, Selleck survived the Bataan Death March and then was held in prisoner-of-war camps until August 1945.

After returning to the United States, Selleck was assigned to the National Guard Bureau in June 1946. He unsuccessfully applied to be reinstated as a brigadier general. Selleck retired from active duty as a colonel on 30 April 1947.

Personal
Selleck was the son of Andrew and Jennie (Barber) Selleck.

Selleck married Gertrude Troth (30 April 1893 – 21 August 1964) on 15 August 1923. They had two daughters and a son. Their son Clyde Andrew Selleck Jr. (23 December 1930 – 12 May 2016) was a 1952 West Point graduate who retired from the Army Corps of Engineers as a colonel.

After his 1947 retirement, Selleck and his wife lived in Alexandria, Virginia. He died at a nursing home in Silver Spring, Maryland and was interred next to his wife at Arlington National Cemetery on 11 January 1973.

Further reading

References

1888 births
1973 deaths
People from Brandon, Vermont
People from Rutland, Vermont
Norwich University alumni
United States Military Academy alumni
Military personnel from Vermont
United States Military Academy faculty
United States Army personnel of World War I
United States Army Command and General Staff College alumni
United States Army War College alumni
United States Army generals of World War II
American prisoners of war in World War II
Bataan Death March prisoners
United States Army colonels
People from Alexandria, Virginia
Burials at Arlington National Cemetery